Ulf Olsson (19 December 1951 – 10 January 2010), also known as Helénmannen ("the Helén man") was a Swedish murderer. He was convicted for the murders of 10-year-old Helén Nilsson and 26-year-old Jannica Ekblad in 1989. Found after a DNA test in 2004 (a test series including 28 other men), Olsson was convicted and sentenced to psychiatric care in 2005. Although he was first brought to the attention of the police in 2002, he had been in contact with two different police officers through anonymous letters and phone calls since only a couple of months after the murders.
The investigation is the second-largest in Swedish history, only surpassed by the investigation of the 1986 assassination of Swedish prime minister Olof Palme.

Murders

Helén Nilsson 

10-year-old Helén Nilsson was abducted on the night of 20 March 1989, and she was found murdered six days later. She had been alive for several days after the abduction and had been raped and assaulted. A number of leads were followed over the years but Olsson was not a person of interest to the police until 2002. A police investigator involved with a re-opening of the case was informed of a man (Olsson) who had been suspected by the locals around the time of the murder. The police were informed and in 2004 he was one of 29 men who were asked for a voluntary DNA sample. The test result indicated that Olsson was the murderer with an error probability of one in 43 million.

Jannica Ekblad
Jannica Ekblad was a prostitute in Malmö. She was found murdered on 4 August 1989, and since Olsson, who was convicted of killing her, claimed he never met her, details about her last hours in life are scarce. She talked to a female prostitute friend through her house phone, attempting to have her follow Ekblad and a man to a location outside of Malmö, but the friend was unable to do so. No names were used, but it is believed that the man was Olsson. Ekblad also visited a male friend of hers, who would occasionally provide her with heroin. Ekblad made a short visit and appeared worried. She was seen leaving together with a man and she was not seen again. In 2004, large amounts of Ekblad's blood were found in the summer cottage that belonged to Olsson at the time of the murder. This and other evidence, including identification of his sperm in her vagina, led to his conviction for her murder.

Connection between the murders
A police technician investigating the two murders was in an early stage convinced that the same killer was responsible for both murders. Although there were clear differences in the two victims (a young girl and a prostitute), other parameters such as the type of location in which the bodies were discovered, the combination of strangulation and massive force against their heads as well as the presence of dog hairs on both bodies, made the investigators suspect there was a connection. Before the evidence against Olsson had been collected in 2004, however, there was no established connection between the murders.

Time in psychiatric care

Death 
At 5:00 am CET on 10 January 2010 Ulf Olsson published a post on his blog where he stated "the best thing for me is simply to be allowed to die, rather than to sit here as a living dead" (Swedish: det bästa för mig är helt enkelt att bara få dö, än att sitta här som en levande död). At approximately 6:15 am CET the same morning Ulf Olsson was found dead by a staff of the psychiatric clinic where he was situated. Officials of the psychiatric clinic confirmed that he had committed suicide by hanging. He left behind one son born after the murders.

Media
In 2020 Ulf Olsson was profiled on the six-part Sveriges Television series Jakten på en mördare (Hunt for a Killer), a series about the murders of Helén Nilsson and Jannica Ekblad. Actor Magnus Schmitz played Olsson. This was broadcast on the BBC in 2021.

References

1951 births
2010 suicides
People convicted of murder by Sweden
People who committed suicide in prison custody
Prisoners sentenced to life imprisonment by Sweden
Prisoners who died in Swedish detention
Suicides by hanging in Sweden
Swedish murderers of children
Swedish rapists
Swedish people convicted of murder
Swedish prisoners sentenced to life imprisonment
Swedish people who died in prison custody